Crepidinae is a subtribe of Cichorieae in the family Asteraceae.

Crepidinae genera recognized by the Global Compositae Database as of June 2022:

× Crepi-Hieracium 
Acanthocephalus 
Askellia 
Crepidiastrum 
Crepidifolium 
Crepis 
Dubyaea 
Faberia 
Garhadiolus 
Heteracia 
Heteroderis 
Hololeion 
Ixeridium 
Ixeris 
Lagoseriopsis 
Lagoseris 
Lapsana 
Lapsanastrum 
Nabalus 
Rhagadiolus 
Sonchella 
Soroseris 
Spiroseris 
Syncalathium 
Taraxacum 
Tibetoseris 
Youngia

References

Cichorieae
Plant subtribes